Sorg is the second studio album released by the Swedish doom metal band Faith. It was released in 2005 on Doom Symphony Records. Sorg means "grief" in Swedish.

Track listing
"Emotional Retard" - 08.12
"The Day I Died" - 06.51
"Winter" - 07.28
"Star Child" - 05.05
"Bride of Christ" - 06.18		
"SöK" - 02.30
"Star Child Part II" - 01.32
"What Would I Do Without Me" - 4.20
"Skogsrået/Finngalkn" - 09.00

Credits
Roger Johansson - Guitars 
Christer Nilsson - Bass, Vocals
Peter Svensson - Drums

2005 albums
Faith (band) albums